The 2020 Kaohsiung mayoral by-election was held on 15 August 2020 following a successful recall attempt. The registered candidates were Chen Chi-mai representing the Democratic Progressive Party, Li Mei-jhen representing the Kuomintang, and Wu Yi-jheng representing the Taiwan People's Party. Chen Chi-mai won the by-election by a landslide margin with slightly over 70 percent of the votes. He replaced acting mayor  on 24 August 2020.

Background
The by-election followed a successful recall attempt against Kaohsiung mayor Han Kuo-yu on 6 June 2020. By law, the Central Election Commission (CEC) was mandated to announce the results of the recall vote within seven days of the vote itself. The law also required the CEC to hold a by-election no later than 11 September 2020, three months after the results of the recall were publicly announced. The CEC confirmed the result on 12 June and announced that the by-election would be held on 15 August.

Procedures and timetable
Han Kuo-yu is barred, by law, from contesting the Kaohsiung mayoralty for four years as a result of the successful recall petition.

Registration of candidates took place between 20 June and 24 June. The sole debate between all three candidates took place on 1 August. Municipal infrastructure was discussed.

Candidates
Following a meeting of the Central Standing Committee of the Democratic Progressive Party on 17 June 2020, Chen Chi-mai was nominated as the DPP candidate for the by-election. On 23 June 2020, the Kuomintang selected Kaohsiung City Councillor Li Mei-jhen to contest the by-election. Following the Kuomintang's announcement, a city councilor affiliated with the  People First Party, joined the Taiwan People's Party to represent the TPP in the by-election.

Opinion polling

Results

Chen Chi-mai won 671,804 of the votes cast on 15 August 2020, a vote share of 70.03%. Li Mei-jhen finished second with 248,478 votes or 25.9%. Wu Yi-jhen claimed 4.06% of the vote, a total of 38,960 ballots. Voter turnout was 41.83%. The Central Election Commission certified Chen's electoral victory on 21 August 2020. On 24 August 2020, Chen replaced acting mayor .

References

Kaohsiung mayoral by-election
Kaohsiung mayoral by-election
Mayoral elections
Kaohsiung
21st century in Kaohsiung
Local elections in Taiwan